Jan Šrámek (11 August 1870 – 22 April 1956) was the prime minister of the Czechoslovak government-in-exile from 21 July 1940 to 5 April 1945. He was the first chairman of the Czechoslovak People's Party and was a Monsignor in the Catholic church.

From 1945 on Czechoslovakia was ruled by the Communist-dominated National Front which also included Šrámek's People's Party. Šrámek and the rest of his coalition worried about the increasing role of the Communist Party. In 1947, the popular support for the Communists started to diminish. To consolidate power, the Communists carried out a coup in February 1948. Šrámek had to resign as the chairman of the People's Party. His successor, Rostislav Petr, and Josef Plojhar, a "strong man" in the People's Party, supported unconditional collaboration with the Communists.

References

1870 births
1956 deaths
People from Olomouc District
People from the Margraviate of Moravia
19th-century Czech Roman Catholic priests
Leaders of KDU-ČSL
Party of National Unity (Czechoslovakia) politicians
Prime Ministers of Czechoslovakia
Members of the Austrian House of Deputies (1907–1911)
Members of the Austrian House of Deputies (1911–1918)
Members of the Moravian Diet
Members of the Revolutionary National Assembly of Czechoslovakia
Members of the Chamber of Deputies of Czechoslovakia (1920–1925)
Members of the Chamber of Deputies of Czechoslovakia (1925–1929)
Members of the Chamber of Deputies of Czechoslovakia (1929–1935)
Members of the Chamber of Deputies of Czechoslovakia (1935–1939)
Members of the Interim National Assembly of Czechoslovakia
Members of the Constituent National Assembly of Czechoslovakia
Palacký University Olomouc alumni
Recipients of the Order of Tomáš Garrigue Masaryk
KDU-ČSL prime ministers
Government ministers of the Czechoslovak government-in-exile